Gábor Egressy (born 11 February 1974) is a Hungarian former football player.

International 
He has 21 caps for the Hungarian national team and participated at the 1996 Summer Olympics in Atlanta, where Hungary failed to progress from the group stage.

Honours
 Nemzeti Bajnokság I: 2002; Runner up 2000
 Magyar Kupa: 1998, 2000; Runner up 1996

References

1974 births
Living people
Hungarian footballers
Hungary international footballers
Hungary under-21 international footballers
Footballers at the 1996 Summer Olympics
Olympic footballers of Hungary
Nemzeti Bajnokság I players
Austrian Football Bundesliga players
MTK Budapest FC players
Budapest Honvéd FC players
Újpest FC players
Zalaegerszegi TE players
Diósgyőri VTK players
FC Admira Wacker Mödling players
1. Wiener Neustädter SC players
Hungarian expatriate footballers
Expatriate footballers in Austria
Association football midfielders